Cloyes may refer to:

Places
 Cloyes-sur-le-Loir, France
 Canton of Cloyes-sur-le-Loir, France
 Cloyes-sur-Marne, France

Persons with the surname
 Bertha Maria Cloyes (19th century)
 Harry Cloyes (20th–21st centuries)
 Shirley Cloyes (20th–21st centuries)

See also
 Stephen of Cloyes